Irwandi Yusuf (ايرواندي يوسف; born 2 August 1960) is an Indonesian politician who was the Governor of Aceh. He was re-elected Governor in early 2017 after serving an earlier term between 2006 and 2012.

Irwandi first won a term as governor in the 2006 Aceh regional election as an independent candidate (non-party). Muhammad Nazar, S. Ag. was his running mate in 2006.  However Irwandi lost his 2012 re-election campaign to Zaini Abdullah following a strong challenge and intensive campaigning by other local political rivals. Allegations that he may have wrongfully granted land concessions involving previously protected high conservation value land to palm oil companies also surfaced before the campaign. In 2017, he was reelected as the Governor of Aceh, with Nova Iriansyah as his partner.

In 2018, the former Free Aceh Movement ( (GAM) leader was the second Aceh governor implicated in a corruption case after Abdullah Puteh, who was sentenced to 10 years for graft surrounding the procurement of an MI-2 Rostov helicopter worth US$872,500.

Irwandi was arrested along with Bener Meriah Regent Ahmadi and eight other individuals on corruption charges. On April 8, 2019, Yusuf was sentenced to seven years in prison for accepting bribes from Ahmadi totaling Rp 1.05 billion (US$74,084) in exchange for granting number of infrastructure projects in the regency. He was also found to have accepted Rp 8.7 billion in gratuities from businessmen during his two terms as governor.

Biography
Irwandi Yusuf, a veterinarian (Alumnus of Syiah Kuala University, Banda Aceh), joined the Free Aceh Movement in 1990, participating for three years before taking up a scholarship at Oregon State University, US, in 1993, where he undertook a master's degree in Veterinary Science.

After returning to Banda Aceh to teach at his alma mater, Irwandi became a founding member of the Acehnese branch of the Fauna and Flora Preservation Society (now known as Fauna and Flora International), lending his veterinary expertise to their conservation campaigns.

Political career

In 2018, the former Free Aceh Movement leader was the second Aceh governor implicated in a corruption case after Abdullah Puteh, who was sentenced to 10 years for graft surrounding the procurement of an MI-2 Rostov helicopter worth US$872,500.

Irwandi was arrested along with Bener Meriah Regent Ahmadi and eight other individuals following a suspicious transaction involving provincial and regency officials, according to the Corruption Eradication Commission (KPK). Since Irwandi was caught red-handed by the KPK, he started to lose supports from Acehnese people.

In the past, his concern for Acehnese socio-political issues led him into further contact with the Free Aceh Movement. He held several different positions in the movement, including as a special staff office for psychological warfare in the Central Free Aceh Movement command, as negotiation coordinator, and as Expert Staff on counter-intelligence in the Central Command of the Aceh National Army. He spent some time in 2001 with the Red Cross, taking the opportunity to study humanitarian law. Irwandi was arrested in 2003 and interned in the Keudah Prison in Banda Aceh.

Irwandi was in his jail cell when the 2004 Indian Ocean earthquake struck. The epicenter of the quake was close to the Acehnese coastline. The population of Aceh before the December 2004 tsunami was 4,271,000, and as of 15 September 2005 was 4,031,589; a discrepancy of 239,411 lives. 170,000 people were confirmed dead.

As the tsunami's waters rose inside the prison, Irwandi fled to the Musholla (prayer room) on the second floor while walls crumbled around him. His only means of escape was to punch a hole through the asbestos ceiling, scramble onto the roof, and hang on until the tsunami abated.
Out of the prison population of 278, Irwandi was one of just 40 survivors.

In the aftermath of the tsunami, the Free Aceh Movement and the Indonesian central command negotiated a peace settlement, and Irwandi renounced his separatist agenda. No longer in conflict with the Indonesian government, the former rebel liaised with the international non-governmental organizations whose presence paved the way for Aceh's first democratic election in almost 30 years. It was a major victory for Irwandi, who won 39.3% of the popular vote, as announced by Public Issue Network and Indonesian Survey Circle.

He took office on 8 February 2007 and established a normal relationship with the army that once pursued him as a Free Aceh Movement rebel. In an unusual move for a former revolutionary, he kept much of the old administration in place although he also moved to reform a range of positions in the senior ranks of the provincial public service. In a 2007 New York Times interview, Irwandi said, "I tell them, 'I believe, I trust you all. You are all trustworthy until you prove otherwise. Then I will know.'" In the same interview, he remarked that his former enemies in the cabinet were welcome to 'rock and roll' with him – "Rock and roll... That means to do something new, rocky, that was never felt before. It is spirit. Spirited people. Young blood. Young spirit." His first term expired on 8 February 2012, and later he lost his reelection run against Zaini Abdullah.

In July 2018, he was arrested by the Corruption Eradication Commission, after allegedly having been caught red-handed receiving bribes.

Environmental issues

One of Irwandi's declared priorities was the protection of Aceh's magnificent rainforest. "This is my obsession, since a long time ago – that Aceh is Aceh, and the forests of Aceh need to be kept well." His first step as a green governor was to embrace the establishment of carbon trading in Aceh using the REDD mechanism, (Reducing Emissions from Deforestation and Degradation) to reinvigorate the faltering economy and prevent further destruction of Aceh's rainforests.

Irwandi declared a moratorium on all logging in Aceh in March 2007, and personally drove out to villages to conduct spot inspections of former logging camps, encouraging the locals to take up sustainable new professions.

However, in 2011, Irwandi's apparent pro-environmental efforts were abruptly halted and reversed. He allegedly surprised supporters when information was uncovered that, on 25 August 2011, he had quietly granted a concession to palm oil supplier PT Kallista Alam which authorised the destruction of a peat swamp forest that is one of the last refuges of the critically endangered Sumatran orangutan. Some of the indigenous peoples took the about-face from the so-called 'Green Governor' personally, calling it a betrayal of their homeland and of his previous environmental credentials. On a legal level, though, many environmental organisations argued that Irwandi's decision breached a presidential moratorium – part of an international deal to save Indonesia's forests – as well as legislation protecting a conservation area where the Tripa swamp is located. Litigation was filed by environmental groups known as WAHLI, challenging the legality of this concession and contending it was granted in an area of protected forest and further violated a moratorium on peatlands conversion.

On 27 March 2012, on the eve of the WAHLI case being heard in court, over seventy illegally set fires mysteriously broke out in this protected Tripa swamp area, including fires set in the oil palm concession granted by Irwandi to PT. Kallista Alam.  Many involved with the WAHLI litigation believed the fires were set in direct defiance of the pending litigation, in effect ignoring any eventual ruling on the alleged legality of Irwandi's granted concession. Mainstream media outlets and environmental organisations report that these fires could lead to the imminent and immediate extinction of the animal inhabitants of the Tripa swamp, including over 200 orangutans.

On 3 April 2012, the Council of Judges of the Banda Aceh National Administrative Court dismissed the WALHI case on jurisdictional grounds. WALHI was expected to appeal. The court acknowledged that the permit that Irwandi approved allowing PT Kallista Allam to convert the Tripa peat swamp into palm oil plantations was indeed located inside the protected Leuser Ecosystem and thus in violation of current Indonesian law. Some legal observers considered the lack of a decision by the court as a case of inappropriate behaviour because it refused to reach a ruling even though the case had been running for nearly five months.

Irwandi had spoken out amid the considerable attention that emerged in the wake of the Tripa peat swamp fires and the WALHI litigation. In reports on 5 April 2012, Irwandi claimed that the land grant, while legal, was 'immoral' yet intended by him to bring world attention to global inability to tackle global climate change, in effect destroying the Tripa forests to save them. Irwandi was quoted as saying, "That concession, 1,600 hectares, was like a pinch to the international community. Maybe I will make a threat to lift the moratorium [entirely] to make them look at Aceh." He also denied that any orangutans had died in the fires despite evidence to the contrary.

Later, after Irwandi had left office, the apparent over-exploitation of the Tripa forest area continued to attract comment. In July 2012 it was reported that officials from the national Environment Ministry who visited the Tripa area said that there were 'strong indications' that deliberate burning had been taking place in the region to convert the area to an oil palm plantation,

On 30 August 2012, judges of the Higher Administrative Court in Medan granted the WAHLI appeal, casting further doubt on Yusuf's one-time claims to be the "Green Governor."  The ruling contained among other things:  1) the granting of the WALHI appeal; 2)cancellation of the contested Tripa license issued by the Governor of Aceh (then Yusuf) on 25 August 2011; 3) an order to the current governor of Aceh to withdraw the contested State Administrative Decision issued by Yusuf on the plantation permit to PT. Kalista Alam issued on 25 August 2011; 4) and an order that the Defendants jointly cover the cost of both court process.

Aceh election in 2012

On 9 April 2012 Irwandi lost the re-election campaign that would have allowed him to continue as governor of Aceh.  Irwandi claimed voter fraud and voter intimidation was the cause of his loss. Zaini Abdullah,
the new governor of Aceh elected to replace Irwandi, took office on 25 June 2012. Zaini, then 72, was the former Free Aceh Movement foreign minister in exile in Sweden before the signing of the 2005 Indonesian government-Free Aceh Movement peace agreement in Helsinki. Deputy Governor Muzakir Manaf, then 48, was the former commander of the Free Aceh Movement's Armed Wing.

Despite a guarantee from incoming deputy governor Muzakir Manaf that Irwandi's safety would be guaranteed if he attended the inauguration of the new provincial government in June 2012, following the event Irwandi was surrounded and beaten about the face and head by uniformed Aceh Party supporters. He was accused of being a traitor to the Free Aceh Movement, the Acehnese militia, because of his negotiations and compromises with the Indonesian government. Irwandi's own governorship campaign in 2006 had been as an independent candidate, not with his former rebel comrades, a fact exploited by the Aceh Party (PA) during the 2012 election campaign to sway popular opinion in their direction. Irwandi stated that the PA's propaganda implying that he betrayed the Free Aceh Movement was the cause of the attack by party supporters. Only one arrest was made.

References

1960 births
Living people
Governors of Aceh
People from Bireuën
Acehnese people
Male veterinarians
Oregon State University alumni
Politics of Aceh
Politicians from Aceh
Indonesian veterinarians
Free Aceh Movement members
Heads of government who were later imprisoned
Indonesian politicians convicted of corruption